The Secretary for Foreign Affairs is the minister for foreign affairs of San Marino. He also considered the Prime Minister of the country.

Together with the Secretary for Interior and the Secretary for Finance, this officer is one of the three members of the executive Congress of State directly appointed by the Grand and General Council, the parliament of the republic. Due to the absence of the office of Prime Minister in the constitutional structure of the State, the Secretary for Foreign Affairs is traditionally seen as the most relevant post in the Sammarinese government.

Between 27 December 2016 and 7 January 2020, the Secretary for Foreign Affairs was Nicola Renzi of the Adesso.sm left-wing coalition. Since 7 January 2020, the Secretary for Foreign Affairs has been Luca Beccari of the Sammarinese Christian Democratic Party.

See also
Congress of State
Grand and General Council
San Marino Secretary for Finance and Budget

References

External links
 Official Website
 Grand and General Council Website (it.)

Government of San Marino